Guntapon Keereeleang (born 22 January 2001), is a Thai professional footballer who plays as a striker for Thai League 3 club Bolaven Samut Prakan (on loan from Bangkok United).

International goals

Thailand U19

References

External links
 

2001 births
Living people
Guntapon Keereeleang
Guntapon Keereeleang
Guntapon Keereeleang
Association football forwards
Guntapon Keereeleang
Guntapon Keereeleang